John Giffard, or Gyffard (died after 1396) was an English-born lawyer and cleric in Ireland in the late fourteenth century, who served briefly as Chief Justice of the Irish Common Pleas.

Little is known of his life before 1377, when he appeared in Ireland as a Crown official. He is known to have travelled through the country on official business, which took him to Ulster in 1383. He was presented to a living in the diocese of Cloyne in 1382 and to another living at Church Lawford, Warwickshire, in 1386. He was appointed Keeper of the Writs in the Court of Common Pleas (Ireland), which was then based in Carlow, and held the position until 1391 when he was replaced by Thomas Gower. In 1383 he spent more than two months in County Down administering the Court's business, and was awarded an extra payment of 40 shillings.

In 1385 he was appointed a justice in eyre (itinerant justice) for three counties, to act with Edmund de Clay, the then Chief Justice. They were also appointed to a Commission of Oyer and  Terminer. He was appointed Chief Justice of the Court of Common Pleas (Ireland) in 1396 but Elrington Ball tells us that he was removed from office a few days later, for unknown reasons.

It is unclear whether he had any connection with the Irish branch of the ancient Giffard family of Devon, who acquired the title Earl of Halsbury. The Irish branch was based at Dromartin, Dundrum, Dublin. There was also a Gyffard family in County Louth in the early 1440s.

References
Ball, F. Elrington The Judges in Ireland 1221-1921 John Murray London 1926
Patent Rolls Richard II 
Smyth, Constantine Joseph Chronicle of the Law Officers of Ireland London Butterworths 1839

Footnotes 

14th-century Irish judges
Chief Justices of the Irish Common Pleas